Ivica Jovanović (born 4 December 1987) is a Serbian football striker who plays for Timok.

Club career
Born in Zaječar, he begin playing with FK Timok in the 2003–04 Second League of Serbia and Montenegro, and he later spent some seasons in Belgium playing with KSC Lokeren. In 2008, he joined Montenegrin team FK Rudar Pljevlja but a year later he moved to FK Mladi Radnik and played with them in the 2009–10 Serbian SuperLiga. At the end of the season he returned to Rudar and this time, in his second spell in the club, he ended up being one of the most used players and helped the club win the 2010–11 Montenegrin Cup. In the following season he contributed with 17 goals for Rudar to achieve the second place in the 2011–12 Montenegrin First League, while in the Cup they reached the final but this time they lost against FK Čelik Nikšić by 2–1 with Jovanović scoring Rudar's goal at that final. He still played with Rudar during their 2012–13 UEFA Europa League campaign (a defeat against Shirak FC in the first qualifying round) however his impressive goalscoring statistics at those two seasons in the Montenegrin First League made him become one of OFK Beograd last signings during the 2012 summer transfer window. He made his debut with OFK in the 2012–13 Serbian SuperLiga on 2 September 2012, in a home match against Serbian title holders, FK Partizan.

On 23 August 2017, Jovanović signed a two-year-deal with Vojvodina.

References

External sources
 Stats from Montenegro at FSCG.co.me
 

1987 births
People from Zaječar
Living people
Serbian footballers
Association football forwards
FK Timok players
K.S.C. Lokeren Oost-Vlaanderen players
FK Rudar Pljevlja players
FK Mladi Radnik players
OFK Beograd players
FK Radnički Niš players
FK Rad players
FK Metalac Gornji Milanovac players
Knattspyrnufélagið Víkingur players
FK Vojvodina players
FK Trayal Kruševac players
Belgian Pro League players
Serbian SuperLiga players
Montenegrin First League players
Úrvalsdeild karla (football) players
Serbian First League players
Serbian expatriate footballers
Expatriate footballers in Belgium
Serbian expatriate sportspeople in Belgium
Expatriate footballers in Montenegro
Serbian expatriate sportspeople in Montenegro
Expatriate footballers in Iceland
Serbian expatriate sportspeople in Iceland